Amaurospiza is a genus of seed-eating birds in the cardinal family Cardinalidae that are found in Middle and South America.

These blue seedeaters are allopatrically distributed and show only small differences in plumage coloration and body measurements. They are sexually dimorphic in plumage: the male is slaty blue while the female is tawny brown. They favour bamboo thickets where they feed on buds, shoots and insects.

Taxonomy and species list 
The genus Amaurospiza  was introduced by the German ornithologist Jean Cabanis in 1861 with Cabanis's seedeater as the type species.

This genus was formerly included in the tanager family Thraupidae. It was moved to the cardinal family Cardinalidae based on a molecular phylogenetic study published in 2007.

The following cladogram shows the phylogenetic relationships within the genus as determined by Juan Areta and collaborators in 2023.

The following table lists the four species in the genus with their distribution.

References

 
Seedeaters
Bird genera
Taxonomy articles created by Polbot